Perfect is the second studio album by Dutch band Intwine. It was released on September 27, 2004 by V2.

Track listing
"Slow Down" – 3:25
"Beautiful" – 3:13
"Perfect" – 3:26
"Cruel Man" – 3:17
"You" – 4:52
"No Ones" – 4:31
"Dutty Step" – 3:58
"Control" – 2:51
"Wouldn't Do It Again" – 3:37
"Blame" – 3:19
"Angel Eyes" – 7:21

Personnel
Roger Peterson – vocals
Jacob Streefkerk – guitar
Touché Eusebius – bass guitar
Kevin Hissink – guitar  
Jeremy Bonarriba – drums
Ferdinand van Duuren – percussion
Gordon Groothedde – production

2004 albums
Intwine albums
V2 Records albums